The 1983 Nabisco Dinah Shore was a women's professional golf tournament, held March 31 to  at Mission Hills Country Club in Rancho Mirage, California. It was the twelfth edition of what is now the ANA Inspiration and its first year as a major championship.

In strong winds, Amy Alcott won the third of her five major titles, two strokes ahead of runners-up Kathy Whitworth and Beth Daniel, the leader after each of the first three rounds. Alcott won the title again in 1988 and 1991.

It was the richest tournament in women's golf in 1983; the $400,000 purse was double that of the 1983 U.S. Women's Open. The final round attendance in 1983 was over 20,000, and this was the first year that amateurs were invited; two made the cut and future major winner Kathy Baker was the low amateur.

The previous year's champion, Sally Little, finished at 303 (+15), 21 strokes back in a tie for 44th place.

Final leaderboard
Sunday, April 3, 1983

Source:

Amateurs: Kathy Baker (+14), Debbie Weldon (+25).

References

External links
Golf Observer leaderboard

Chevron Championship
Golf in California
Nabisco Dinah Shore
Nabisco Dinah Shore
Nabisco Dinah Shore
Nabisco Dinah Shore
Nabisco Dinah Shore
Women's sports in California